Daniela Sofia Korn Ruah (born December 2, 1983) is an American-Portuguese actress and film director best known for playing NCIS Special Agent Kensi Blye in the CBS police procedural series NCIS: Los Angeles.

Early life
Ruah was born in Boston, U.S., to Jewish parents from Portugal, where her mother is an otologist and her father is an ENT surgeon. When Ruah was 5,  the family moved back to Portugal, where she attended St Julian's School and, at 16, began acting in telenovelas. She won a Portuguese-television dance competition.

Ruah moved to the UK at the age of 18 and earned a Bachelor of Arts in performing arts from London Metropolitan University. She returned to Portugal where she continued acting, and in 2007 moved to New York City to study at the Lee Strasberg Theatre and Film Institute.

Ruah stated that she grew up in an environment that was both Sephardic and Ashkenazi; her father is of Portuguese-Jewish ancestry, and her mother's Jewish roots are in Russia, Ukraine and Portugal. She holds both Portuguese and American citizenship.

Career
Ruah started acting in Portuguese soap operas when she was a teen. She made her acting debut at 16, when she played Sara on the soap opera Jardins Proibidos ("Forbidden Gardens").

At 18, Ruah moved to London to attend college. After graduation, she returned to Portugal to pursue her acting career. She was the winner of the celebrity dancing competition Dança Comigo (the Portuguese version of Dancing with the Stars) and got main roles in television series, short films, and theatre. In 2007, she moved to New York to study at the Lee Strasberg Theatre and Film Institute.

Ruah stars as Special Agent Kensi Blye in NCIS: Los Angeles, which first aired on September 22, 2009. In 2011, she portrayed the character in a crossover guest appearance on the series Hawaii Five-0.

In 2013, Ruah appeared in David Auburn's play Proof at Los Angeles' Hayworth Theatre.

On January 8, 2018, it was confirmed that Ruah would co-host the Eurovision Song Contest 2018 in Lisbon, Portugal alongside Catarina Furtado, Sílvia Alberto and Filomena Cautela.

Personal life
Ruah has a distinguishable birthmark in her right eye, called the nevus of Ota.

Ruah married David Olsen, the older brother and stunt double of Ruah's NCIS: Los Angeles co-star Eric Christian Olsen, in an interfaith ceremony in 2014. Olsen is Lutheran. They have 2 children, a son, River Isaac Ruah Olsen (born December 2013), and a daughter, Sierra Esther Ruah Olsen (born September 2016).

Filmography

References

External links

 

1983 births
20th-century Sephardi Jews
21st-century Sephardi Jews
20th-century American actresses
21st-century American actresses
Actresses from Boston
Portuguese actresses
Jewish Portuguese actresses
Portuguese people of Ukrainian descent
Portuguese people of Russian descent
American people of Portuguese-Jewish descent
American people of Ukrainian-Jewish descent
American people of Russian-Jewish descent
American television actresses
Golden Globes (Portugal) winners
Lee Strasberg Theatre and Film Institute alumni
Living people